Christ Crucified is a 1632 painting by Diego Velázquez depicting the Crucifixion of Jesus. The work, painted in oil on canvas, measures 249 × 170 cm and is owned by the Museo del Prado.

During his stay in Rome, Velázquez made various nude studies he used in later paintings, such as Apollo at the Forge of Vulcan (1630) and Joseph's Tunic (1630). Art critics assert that the nude study for this painting is exceptional and masterly in its fusion of serenity, dignity and nobility. It is a life-size frontal nude, without the support of a narrative scene.

Description 
Velázquez followed the accepted iconography in the 17th century. His master, Francisco Pacheco, a big supporter of classicist painting, painted the crucified Christ using the same iconography later adopted by Velázquez: four nails, feet together and supported against a little wooden brace, in a classic contrapposto posture. Both arms draw a subtle curve, instead of forming a triangle. The loincloth is painted rather small, thus showing the nude body as much as possible. The head shows a narrow halo, as if it came from the figure itself; the face is resting on the chest, showing just enough of his features. The long, straight hair covers a great part of the face, perhaps foreshadowing the death, already inflicted as shown by the wound on the right side. It lacks the characteristic dramatic qualities of Baroque painting.

History 
Because of lack of information, the date of the painting is unknown. Nevertheless, historians believe the work was made after Velázquez' return from Italy, probably between 1631 and 1632. The influence of Classicist painting is shown by the calm posture of the body, the idealized face and the leaning head. On the other hand, the influence of Caravaggism can be seen in the strong chiaroscuro between the background and the body, and in the strong, artificial lightning over the cross.

It was most likely a commission for the San Plácido Convent sacristy. The painting was among the impounded items of Manuel Godoy, but was returned to María Teresa de Borbón, 15th Countess of Chinchón. After her death, the painting was passed on to her brother-in-law, the Duke of San Fernando de Quiroga, who gave it to King Fernando VII. The king then sent the painting to the Museo del Prado.

Legacy 
The spirituality and mystery of this painting have inspired much religious writing, notably the poem El Cristo de Velázquez by the Spanish writer and philosopher Miguel de Unamuno.

Bibliography 
  Historia general del arte, Tomo XIII, colección Summa Artis, La pintura española del siglo XVII. Author, José Camón Aznar. Editorial Espasa Calpe S.A. Madrid 1977
  La pintura en el barroco José Luis Morales y Marín Espasa Calpe S.A. 1998 
  Museo del Prado. Pintura española de los siglos XVI y XVII Enrique Lafuente Ferrari Aguilar S.A. 1964
 Cirlot, L. (dir.), Museo del Prado II, Col. «Museos del Mundo», Tomo 7, Espasa, 2007.

External links
Velázquez , exhibition catalog from The Metropolitan Museum of Art (fully available online as PDF), which contains material on Christ Crucified (see index)

1632 paintings
Paintings by Diego Velázquez in the Museo del Prado
Religious paintings by Diego Velázquez
Crucifixion of Jesus in art